Guri i Zi (Engl. "black stone") is a village and a former municipality in the Shkodër County, northwestern Albania. At the 2015 local government reform it became a subdivision of the municipality Shkodër. The population at the 2011 census was 8,085.

Settlements 
There are 10 settlements within Guri i Zi.

 Gajtan
 Ganjollë
 Guri i Zi
 Juban
 Kuç
 Mazrek
 Rragam
 Rrencë
 Sheldi
 Vukatanë

References 

 
Former municipalities in Shkodër County
Administrative units of Shkodër
Villages in Shkodër County